Dudka  ( [ˈdutka])) is a Ukrainian, Russian and Polish surname derived from the Eastern Slavic word дудка for "fife", "pipe" that is also present in the Ukrainian, Polish and Russian diaspora.
Notable people with the name Dudka include:
Dariusz Dudka (born 1983), Polish football player
Yevgenia Dudka (1991-2023), Ukrainian major of the civil protection service of the State Emergency Service of Ukraine.
Mykyta Dudka (born 2000), Ukrainian football player
Stanley Dudka (1923–2008), Canadian fishery officer
Vyacheslav Dudka (born 1960), Russian politician.

References

See also
 

Russian-language surnames
Ukrainian-language surnames
Polish-language surnames
Occupational surnames